An excitatory amino acid receptor agonist, or glutamate receptor agonist, is a chemical substance which agonizes one or more of the glutamate receptors.

Examples include:

 AMPA
 Glutamic acid
 Ibotenic acid
 Kainic acid
 N-Methyl-D-aspartic acid
 Quisqualic acid

See also
 Excitatory amino acid receptor antagonist
 Excitatory amino acid reuptake inhibitor

References

External links
 

Amino acids